Eucalyptus praecox, or brittle gum, is a tree native to central New South Wales.

References

praecox
Myrtales of Australia
Flora of New South Wales
Trees of Australia